Mueang Chan is a district (amphoe) of Sisaket province, northeastern Thailand.

History
The minor district (king amphoe) was created on 1 April 1992, when three tambons were split off from Uthumphon Phisai district. It was upgraded to a full district on 11 October 1997.

Geography
Neighboring districts are (from the north clockwise): Pho Si Suwan, Uthumphon Phisai, and Huai Thap Than of Sisaket Province; Samrong Thap, Non Narai, and Rattanaburi of Surin province.

Administration
The district is divided into three sub-districts (tambons), which are further subdivided into 52 villages (mubans). There are no municipal (thesaban) areas. There are three tambon administrative organizations (TAO).

References

External links
amphoe.com

Mueang Chan